Van Buren House may refer to:

David Van Buren House, Fulton, New York, listed on the NRHP in Oswego County, New York
John Van Buren Tavern, Fulton, New York, listed on the NRHP in Oswego County, New York 
Volkert Van Buren House, Fulton, New York, listed on the NRHP in Oswego County, New York
Martin Van Buren National Historic Site, Kinderhook, New York, listed on the NRHP in New York
Sarah Belle Van Buren House, Hartland, Wisconsin, listed on the National Register of Historic Places in Waukesha County, Wisconsin